"Carol" is a song written and recorded by Chuck Berry, first released by Chess Records in 1958, with "Hey Pedro" as the B-side.  The single reached number 18 on Billboard's Hot 100 and number 9 on the magazine's R&B chart.  In 1959, it was included on his first compilation album, Chuck Berry Is on Top.

Berry employs his well-known guitar figure, which AllMusic critic Matthew Greenwald describes as "a guitar lick that indeed propelled not just Berry's greatest works, but the rock & roll genre itself."  The Rolling Stones recorded it in 1964 for their debut album and a live version was released on Get Yer Ya-Ya's Out! (1969). A live recording from Oakland in November 1969 is included in the bootleg Live'r Than You'll Ever Be. Their recordings were preceded by a performance by the Beatles in 1963, later included on Live at the BBC (1994).  Several other artists have also recorded the song.

References

1958 songs
1958 singles
1963 singles
1964 singles
Songs written by Chuck Berry
Chuck Berry songs
The Beatles songs
The Rolling Stones songs
Song recordings produced by George Martin
Song recordings produced by Andrew Loog Oldham
Decca Records singles
Chess Records singles